Bryan Deasley (born 29 June 1988) is a Scottish professional footballer who plays for Lochee United.

Career
Born in Dundee, and a product of the Dundee youth system, Deasley made his debut on 26 December 2005 against Airdrie United in a First Division match. He won 2 young player of the month awards and then won the young player of the year award. He scored a memorable goal against Dundee derby rivals Dundee United.

Towards the end of the 2007–08 season, Deasley was loaned out to Arbroath. He was then loaned to Second Division Cowdenbeath and a year loan at Third Division side Forfar Athletic. On 4 May 2010, he was informed along with three other players that he was no longer wanted by Dundee and was free to look for another club.

Deasley then signed for Forfar Athletic.

In June 2011, Deasley left the Loons to join relegated Peterhead.

Deasley went on loan to junior side Carnoustie Panmure in December 2012, before finally leaving Peterhead to sign for fellow junior side Lochee United in February 2013.

He resigned for Forfar Athletic in the summer of 2013.

On 31 August Deasley join Montrose on loan until January 2014.

On 26 June 2015, Deasley join Lochee United.

Career statistics

A.  The "Other" column constitutes appearances and goals (including substitutes) in the Scottish Challenge Cup, Scottish First Division Play-offs and Scottish Second Division Play-offs

References

External links

Living people
1988 births
Scottish footballers
Dundee F.C. players
Arbroath F.C. players
Forfar Athletic F.C. players
Peterhead F.C. players
Carnoustie Panmure F.C. players
Lochee United F.C. players
Footballers from Dundee
Association football forwards
Scottish Football League players
Scottish Junior Football Association players
Montrose F.C. players
Scottish Professional Football League players